Slovak Pirate Party (SPS) is a non-governmental organisation established in December 2011 as the Pirate Party of the Slovak Republic. The organisation is based on the model of the Swedish Pirate Party. The party is a member of the Pirate Parties International.

Status
Two members of Slovak Pirate Party became candidates to the Slovak Parliament in the March 2012 election, enlisted on the ticket of the newly established political party Ordinary People and Independent Personalities - Peter Blaščák at number 70 and Martin Bibko at number 77.

See also
 Slovak politics

External links
 Website
 Facebook SPS
 WikiSPS PP-International

References

 Na Slovensku vzniká Pirátska strana at  

Slovak Republic
Political parties in Slovakia

de:Piratenpartei#Slovenská Pirátska Strana